Munti Wayi (Ancash Quechua munti tree, wayi house, "tree house", Hispanicized spelling Monte Huay) is a  mountain in the Cordillera Blanca in the Andes of Peru. It is located in the Ancash Region, Bolognesi Province, Aquia District. It lies northeast of Rahu Kutaq and southeast of Pastu Ruri.

References

Mountains of Peru
Mountains of Ancash Region